Hillman is a city in Morrison County, Minnesota, United States. The population was 23 at the 2020 census.

History
Hillman was platted in 1908, and named after nearby Hillman Creek. A post office called Hillman was established in 1913, and remained in operation until 1994.

Geography

Demographics

2010 census
As of the census of 2010, there were 38 people, 15 households, and 12 families living in the city. The racial makeup of the city was 100.0% White.

There were 15 households, of which 33.3% had children under the age of 18 living with them, 60.0% were married couples living together, 13.3% had a female householder with no husband present, 6.7% had a male householder with no wife present, and 20.0% were non-families. 20.0% of all households were made up of individuals, and 6.7% had someone living alone who was 65 years of age or older. The average household size was 2.53 and the average family size was 2.83.

The median age in the city was 37 years. 28.9% of residents were under the age of 18; 2.7% were between the ages of 18 and 24; 23.7% were from 25 to 44; 31.6% were from 45 to 64; and 13.2% were 65 years of age or older. The gender makeup of the city was 42.1% male and 57.9% female.

2000 census
As of the census of 2000, there were 29 people, 14 households, and 11 families living in the city. The racial makeup of the city was 100.00% White.

There were 14 households, out of which 14.3% had children under the age of 18 living with them, 71.4% were married couples living together, 7.1% had a female householder with no husband present, and 21.4% were non-families. 21.4% of all households were made up of individuals; none had someone living alone who was 65 years of age or older. The average household size was 2.07 and the average family size was 2.36.

In the city, the population was spread out, with 13.8% under the age of 18, 6.9% from 18 to 24, 13.8% from 25 to 44, 48.3% from 45 to 64, and 17.2% who were 65 years of age or older. The median age was 58 years. For every 100 females, there were 93.3 males. For every 100 females age 18 and over, there were 92.3 males.

The median income for a household in the city was $26,250, and the median income for a family was $26,250. Males had a median income of $0 versus $15,417 for females. The per capita income for the city was $11,126. There were no families and 7.4% of the population living below the poverty line, including no under eighteens and none of those over 64.

Education
Its school system is Onamia Public Schools.

References

Cities in Minnesota
Cities in Morrison County, Minnesota